The Henderson molybdenum mine is a large underground molybdenum mine west of the town of Empire in Clear Creek County, Colorado, USA.  The Henderson mine, which has produced molybdenum since 1976, is owned by Freeport-McMoRan.  

The Henderson mine is North America's largest producer of primary molybdenum.  2007 production was 40 million pounds of molybdenum, with a value of $1.1 billion.

History
The Henderson mine is near the Urad mine, which produced molybdenum from 1914 to the 1960s, before exhausting its orebody. Owner Climax Molybdenum Co. recognized the potential for deeper orebodies in the area, and discovered the Henderson deposit in 1964. The mine was named after mining engineer Robert Henderson.

Production began in 1976; on Jan. 4, 2010, workers mined the billionth pound of molybdenum.  In 2006, remaining ore reserves were estimated to be 500 million pounds of recoverable molybdenum.

It was considered by the National Science Foundation as one of the two final candidates for the Deep Underground Science and Engineering Laboratory, but lost to the Homestake Mine in South Dakota.

Geology
The deposit is a porphyry-type deposit consisting of a stockwork of small veins of molybdenite in rhyolite porphyries of Tertiary age that intrude into Precambrian Silver Plume granite.  The ore averages 0.2% molybdenum.  The molybdenite is associated with pyrite and quartz.  The deposit is similar to other porphyry molybdenum deposits such as the Climax mine in Colorado and the Questa mine in New Mexico. 

The Henderson deposit is located in the Colorado Mineral Belt, a northeast-southwest alignment of metal deposits that crosses the mountainous part of Colorado from Boulder to Durango.

Mining

Mining is done by block caving.  In 1980 the cavity produced by the panel caving broke through to the surface, producing a large glory hole (subsidence) on the side of Red Mountain. 

The ore is carried by a  conveyor belt system extending through a  tunnel beneath the Continental Divide  and then  overland to the ore processing mill near Parshall, Colorado.  The ore is treated by froth flotation to obtain molybdenite concentrate, which is shipped to a plant in Fort Madison, Iowa for further processing.

Prior to August 1999, ore was hauled on a  narrow gauge railroad, double-tracked and electrified at 1,400 V DC, except in the ore loading area, where 600 V DC was used.  4-wheel locomotives weighing  hauled trains of 4-wheel  ore cars. A typical train of 20 to 25 cars required 3 locomotives, two pulling and one pushing up the long 3-percent grade in the tunnel. After 1996, train operation was fully automated. Rail haulage was abandoned when the ore above the rail level in the mine was exhausted. Within the tunnel, one of the two tracks remains available for maintenance access.

Location
It is approximately 9 miles west of Empire, Colorado.

Outdoor recreation
The Henderson mine is on private land.  However, the mine is surrounded by US Forest Service land of the Arapaho National Forest.  There is a public parking lot on the Jones Pass Road near the mine, and the National Forest land near the mine is popular year-round for hiking, cross-country skiing, and snowshoeing.

See also
 List of molybdenum mines
 Molybdenum mining in the United States

References

External links
Freeport-McMoRan website: Henderson mine (dead link 10 February 2017)
MinDat.Org: Henderson mine
"Henderson Produces Billionth Pound of Molybdenum", January 4, 2010
 

Buildings and structures in Clear Creek County, Colorado
Mines in Colorado
Underground mines in the United States
Molybdenum mines in the United States
Freeport-McMoRan mines
1976 establishments in Colorado
3 ft 6 in gauge railways in the United States